R.Nulenuru  is a village in Holalkere Taluk, near Chitradurga in the Indian state of Karnataka.

Cities and towns in Chitradurga district